St. Francis Hospital is a former Catholic hospital which operated in New York City during the 19th and 20th centuries.

History

It was founded in 1865 by the Poor Sisters of St. Francis, who had been founded in Germany in 1851 by Mother Frances Schervier.

In the late 19th century and early 20th century it was located at 407-409 East 5th Street, Manhattan, where it served the large German immigrant population of the Lower East Side.  In 1892 it had 240 beds. In 1906 the hospital moved to 525 East 142nd Street, in the Mott Haven section of the Bronx, also largely populated by German immigrants.

The hospital provided free care to all comers without respect to nationality or religion. Faced with a crumbling infrastructure, for which there were not sufficient funds to replace, the hospital was closed by the Archdiocese of New York on December 31, 1966, amidst wide popular protest.

In 1970, a 17-story New York City Housing complex was built on the site.

References 
Notes

Source
  (illustration opposite p. 355).

Hospital buildings completed in 1906
Defunct hospitals in New York City
Hospitals established in 1865
Hospitals disestablished in 1966
Franciscan hospitals
1865 establishments in New York (state)
1966 disestablishments in New York (state)
Mott Haven, Bronx
Defunct hospitals in Manhattan
Defunct hospitals in the Bronx
Catholic hospitals in North America
Catholic health care